The 1970 Hawaii gubernatorial election was Hawaii's fourth gubernatorial election.  The election was held on November 3, 1970, and resulted in a victory for the Democratic candidate,  incumbent Governor of Hawaii John A. Burns over Republican candidate, Judge Samuel Pailthorpe King.  Burns received more votes than King in every county in the state.

Both the Democratic and Republican primaries were contested, with the primary votes held on October 3, 1970.

Governor Burns became ill to the point of incapacitation for the last year of this term, and although he remained the governor in name, Lt. Gov. George Ariyoshi took the role of acting governor from October 26, 1973 until the end of this term on December 2, 1974.

, this was the most recent Hawaii gubernatorial election in which both candidates are now deceased.

Democratic primary

Candidates

Declared
 John A. Burns, incumbent Governor
 G.J. Fontes
 Thomas Gill, Lieutenant Governor

Results

Republican primary

Candidates

Declared
 Samuel Pailthorpe King, First Circuit Court and Family Court Judge
 Hebden Porteus, State Senator
 David Watumull

Results

General election

References

1970
1970 United States gubernatorial elections
1970 Hawaii elections